The Elite Police, also known as the "Elite Force" or "Police Commandos", is a branch of the Punjab Police specializing in Counter-Terrorist operations and VIP security duties, as well as acting against serious crime and performing high-risk operations which can't be carried out by the regular police. It was formed in 1998  as a counterterrorism unit, but over time its duties expanded to VIP escort.

History
The Elite Force was created on the order of the then Punjab Chief Minister Shahbaz Sharif in 1997–1998.  In 2004, more funds were allocated for its expansion, and 5000 new personnel were inducted.  New checkpoints for curbing street crime were created across Punjab and manned by the Elite Force.  Their work drew attention in the wake of the 2009 attack on the Sri Lankan cricket team in Lahore.
The Elite Police were also extensively involved in neutralizing enemy combatants who had laid siege to the Manawan Police Training School during the 2009 Lahore police academy attacks.

Mumtaz Qadri, the bodyguard who shot and killed Punjab governor Salmaan Taseer in Islamabad on January 4, 2011 was a member of the Elite Police.

On August 12, 2017 a twelve year old boy was crushed to death by Elite Force Vehicle accompanying Mr. Nawaz Sharif (ex-prime minister). None of the vehicles including rescue vehicles or the vehicle responsible stopped or took the boy to the hospital. Family of the victim was also pressurized later to omit vehicle registration number from first information report to police.

Organization 
The Elite Police Force is headed by the Additional Inspector-General of Police, Elite Police Force, Punjab, Lahore. Currently, Kunwar Shahrukh, Additional Inspector-General of Police is leading Elite Police Police Force in Punjab.  During operations, they are headed by an officer trained in a "Basic Elite" course.

The Elite Force is used in a range of special operations including "high-risk searches, raids and rescue operations".
Members of the Elite Force are trained for six months at the Elite Police Training School (EPTS) at Badian, Lahore, by Pakistan's Special police trainers  in personal combat, martial arts, crowd control, close quarters battle (CQB), and reconnaissance. They are trained in the use of a range of weapons, including the AK-47, Glock Pistol, MP5, and grenades. They can use different kind of weapons like Pakistan-made G3, machine-guns etc. Their arsenal also included flak jackets. They are trained in martial arts and boxing practice during training period. They are often seen in black and green track suits.

Equipment
 Glock series Pistol
 Beretta 92FS Pistol
 Heckler & Koch MP5 SMG 
 M4 carbine Assault Rifle
 HK G3 Assault Rifle
 Type 56 Assault Rifle
 POF PSR-90 Sniper Rifle
 MG3 Machine Gun
 POF Eye
 Shotguns
 Hand Grenades 
 Smoke Grenades
 Binoculars
 Night vision goggles
And other protective gears.

Head of Organization
Additional Inspector General of Police is the head of Elite Police, Punjab. Hereunder, is the list of Addl: IGPs who have headed this unit.

See also
List of Special Response Units
Elite Police Academy

References

External links
Official website
Official website Elite Police Punjab Pakistan
  Sargodha Elite force

Non-military counterterrorist organizations
Punjab Police (Pakistan)
Police special forces of Pakistan
Organizations established in 1998
1998 establishments in Pakistan